WikiCandidate was a wiki designed to collaboratively create a virtual political campaign for a fictional U.S. presidential candidate. Begun by students and faculty at the Cornell University Department of Communication, its content was intended to be a tool for understanding what characteristics the ideal candidate would have, as determined through a consensus among the community of users. For the university, the endeavor was a research project investigating online civic participation. The site was run on MediaWiki and registering an account was required to edit. All content on the site was published under a Creative Commons Attribution-Noncommercial-Share Alike 3.0 Unported license.

See also
 List of wikis

References

External links
 Cornell University Dept. of Communication

MediaWiki websites
Wiki communities
Fictional presidents of the United States
Creative Commons-licensed websites